The Recording Arts Talent Awards (RATA) were an annual award honouring excellence in recorded New Zealand music. The RATAs ran from 1973 to 1976, before being replaced by the RIANZ Awards.

History 

The RATAs were founded in 1973 when the New Zealand Federation of Phonographic Industry decided to institute a new award to replace the Loxene Golden Disc award. Federation member Fred Smith claimed that block voting in the Loxene Golden Disc's public vote was "making a farce" of the awards, so the RATAs were determined by a panel of judges. Despite the state monopoly on radio stations being broken in 1970, in order to qualify for the RATA awards, all nominated songs had to have been broadcast by the NZBC.

The final RATA was held in 1976. After a year off in 1978, the awards became known as the RIANZ Awards (later the New Zealand Music Awards) after the NZFPI changed its name to the Recording Industry Association of New Zealand (RIANZ).

Winners

1973 winners

1974 winners

1975 winners

1976 winners

1977 winners 

After 1976, there were no further RATA ceremonies. However, at the 1977 APRA Silver Scroll ceremony, NZFPI presented a $500 prize for Best Rock Composition. This award went to Dave Calder of The Waves for his song "Conversation Over to You".

References 

New Zealand music awards